Nkwareu is a village in the Peren district of Nagaland, India. It is located in the Jalukie Circle.

Demographics 

According to the 2011 census of India, Nkwareu has 123 households. The effective literacy rate (i.e. the literacy rate of population excluding children aged 6 and below) is 74.36%.

References 

Villages in Jalukie Circle